Arie Cornelis Brokking  is a Dutch professional volleyball coach.

Career as coach
In 2007 Brokking was appointed to lead the Great Britain men's volleyball team into the 2012 Summer Olympics. At the 2012 Summer Olympics, they lost all five matches. Due to the team's financial problems, Brokking left the GB team to become a coach in Tunisia.

Honours

Clubs
 National championships
 1995/1996  French Championship, with Paris Volley
 1996/1997  French Cup, with Paris Volley
 1996/1997  French Championship, with Paris Volley
 1997/1998  French Championship, with Paris Volley
 2013/2014  Tunisian Championship, with Étoile Sportive du Sahel

References

External links
 
 Coach profile at Volleybox.net

1955 births
Living people
Dutch volleyball coaches
Volleyball coaches of international teams
Volleyball in the United Kingdom
British Olympic coaches
Dutch expatriate sportspeople in Germany
Dutch expatriate sportspeople in Belgium
Dutch expatriate sportspeople in France
Dutch expatriate sportspeople in Poland
Dutch expatriate sportspeople in the United Kingdom
Dutch expatriate sportspeople in Greece
Dutch expatriate sportspeople in Saudi Arabia
Dutch expatriate sportspeople in Tunisia
Dutch expatriate sportspeople in Austria
AZS Częstochowa coaches
BBTS Bielsko-Biała coaches